The Rezvani Beast is a two-door sports car manufactured by Rezvani Motors. The car is based on the Ariel Atom and the Lotus Elise (for the Beast Alpha X Blackbird) sports cars utilizing them as its chassis. Prices can range from US$95,000 to US$325,000.

Models

Beast 
The Rezvani Beast is the base model of the lineup. However, it is more expensive than its Targa variant, with an average cost at US$159,000. Because of the car's presence as a convertible, the car has been dubbed the "Rezvani Beast Speedster". The Beast was designed by Azerbaijani designer Samir Sadikhov. 

The Beast contains a 2.4 liters supercharged I4 with a dual overhead camshaft and intercooler, producing . This power is delivered to the rear wheels by a 6-speed manual transmission, which is the only transmission available for the model. This car contains a chromoly tubular chassis and a dual-layer carbon fiber body without doors. The underpinnings are from an Ariel Atom. The wheels are made entirely from forged aluminum.

A  version of the Beast came out later.

The design for the base model Beast was built in a year. The Beast also has the original Ariel Atom brake calipers and discs installed, and has a custom horn. Because the car is a convertible, it had to have waterproof leather installed.

Beast Alpha 
The Beast Alpha is essentially a coupe version of the Beast. The car debuted in a Rezvani keynote in 2016. Even as the Alpha is not a base model, it is cheaper than its speedster counterpart at US$95,000, due to price drops after its debut. It was originally US$200,000. This price drop began in 2018.

The car includes what Rezvani calls "Sidewinder" doors, which are doors that pop to the side and slide forward. This is the only Beast to have these doors. However, this is not standard, but a US$10,000 option.

The car has a new 2.4-liter turbocharged I4 tuned by Cosworth, which pushes out . The car's  acceleration time is slower than the regular Beast, at 3.5 seconds. The car's power is sent to the rear wheels by a 6-speed manual. Instead of the chromoly chassis, the chassis is aluminum. This is due to the addition of new features. These include air conditioning, driver-selectable traction control, airbags, a roof (Targa style; removable), climate control, and functional doors.

The name Alpha slightly resembles this lower specification rating because of its usage in early models before their final product.

The car's options are very costly. For example, a 6-speed semi-automatic with paddle shifters is available for US$15,000, and the "Sidewinder" doors are averaged US$10,000.

Beast X 
The Beast X is the most powerful variant of the Beast, priced at US$159,000 to US$270,000. The prices differ because there are two variants; one for the Beast, and another for the Beast Alpha.

Only five of these cars will be produced. The convertible X contains the 2.5 liters Cosworth I4 but is turbocharged this time by a pair of Borg Warners. This pushes out . The car's design has been slightly changed for aerodynamic purposes. There are new added aero gaps, and fender grilles, and also a new split spoiler that loosely resembles the Pagani Zonda C12. The front and rear have been revised to add extra downforce, along with the gaps, grilles, and spoiler. This power is sent to the rear wheels by a 6-speed manual transmission, with a semi-automatic as an option for the X. The car has a  time of 2.5 seconds.

Beast Alpha X
The coupe version of X, with the same 2.5-liter turbocharged Cosworth I4, but only makes . No aerodynamic pieces are added though, and is basically the same design to the Beast Alpha. The power is delivered by a 6-speed manual transmission. The body is made of carbon fiber.

Beast Alpha X Blackbird
The most extreme version of the Beast Alpha dubbed the Beast Alpha X Blackbird was launched in 2018. The car features a body made from carbon fibre, sidewinder doors, a signature element of Beast Alpha and a 2.5-litre turbocharged Inline-4 engine developed in collaboration with Cosworth producing . Power is transferred to the rear wheels through a 6-speed manual transmission while sequential manual transmission is available as an option. Comfort of the occupants is also kept in consideration and features such as power windows, air conditioning, central locking system and infotainment system is included as standard. The car is available at a base price of US$325,000.

Reception 
Jay Leno featured a review about the Rezvani Beast on his YouTube channel. Overall, the car received positive reception from him.

Jeff Glucker from the channel The Hooniverse reviewed the Rezvani Beast. He mentioned the car used a very well-made platform (the Ariel Atom), a good engine, good suspension, and nice looks. Forward visibility was well done, but the side mirrors weren't too practical. The car was already difficult to drive, but Glucker mentioned that Rezvani had slightly altered the wheelbase to give better stability. The removable steering was made for much a better entrance and exit on the car. Suspension was amazing, and grip was very good thanks to the width and stickiness. The transmission shifter was also well done, the clutch felt quick, and the pedals were good. Glucker also mentioned that the car felt very raw because of the absence of power steering.

Matt Farah reviewed a Beast, and drove it down the Ortega Highway of California State Route 74. He mentioned that the car`s steering is very tight, making it feel like a Le Mans Prototype or a Formula One car, which made it difficult to manage around roads. He also mentioned that the gas pedal was heavy to push, and that steering without power assist and having large tires made steering harder. He then stated that braking wasn't too stable, the car felt like an actual race car and not a road car that fulfills the race car feel, and that the turning radius was a bit bad. The car was also too sensitive in Farah's view. Because of these downsides when driving, he stated that professional drivers are able to take the struggles, but not so much for amateurs. it also made him frightened to push further. He did mention that the styling was beautiful, it was quick, and the supercharger made the car sound good, on the positive side. Overall, Farah said that the car was not worth US$159,000, but he was happy it exists because of how cool and unique it is.

References

External links
Rezvani pages: Beast, Beast Alpha, Beast Alpha X, Beast X

Beast
Cars introduced in 2015
Coupés
Roadsters
Rear mid-engine, rear-wheel-drive vehicles
First car made by manufacturer